Mary Louise Graffam (May 11, 1871 – August 17, 1921) was an American teacher, high school principal, Christian missionary, and an important witness to the Armenian genocide. In 1915 she was deported and is considered a victim of the Armenian genocide.

Life
Mary Louise Graffam was born in Monson, Maine. Her father was a farmer and her mother died at the age of forty-one shortly after Mary Graffam's graduation from high school. At the age of five, she and her family moved to Andover, Massachusetts.

She was raised in the Christian faith with her sister Winona. As a teenager, a religious experience moved Graffam join the local church and take part in services. While at Oberlin College, a school known for its missionary training, Graffam began studying to become a foreign missionary. After graduating in 1894, she taught in various schools in Massachusetts, New Jersey, and Washington D.C. She failed to go to Japan to become a missionary. However, in 1901 she was sent to Sivas, Ottoman Empire to be in charge of Female Education in the mission post of American Board of Commissioners for Foreign Missions of the village.

When she arrived in the Ottoman Empire, she was thirty-one years old. She eventually became the principal of the girls' high school in Sivas, where she taught algebra and geometry. As a supervisor of schools in the neighboring villages, she was also a teacher of Bible studies and trigonometry at the Sivas Teachers College. She became fluent in Armenian and was conversational in Turkish and French. She kept her post as a teacher until the start of World War I and the eventual culmination of the Armenian genocide.

She died in Sivas in 1921 due to heart failure after a successful surgery.

Armenian genocide

Mary Louise Graffam was in Sivas when the Armenian genocide started. In its early stages, Graffam witnessed the arrests of the Armenian male population. She noted that the "Turks told us that if the men were not given up, the houses would be burned and the families would be hung in front of them." She also states that the photographs of weapons used to depict the Armenians as criminals were false, and that "Turkish ammunition had been added" to make a stronger case. When the deportations began, Graffam was also deported along with her students on July 7, 1915, as part of a convoy that consisted of 2,000 Armenians. The gendarmes who were assigned to protect the convoy gave guns and ammunition to local Kurdish groups who eventually robbed the deportees and abducted some of the girls. Some Kurdish groups were throwing stones at the Armenian deportees. While marching, she saw deportees shot dead when attempting to drink water from a nearby river. She had also received reports that there was a "valley of corpses". Mary Graffam described the road leading to Malatya, where she was prevented by Turkish gendarmes from going any further:

When Graffam returned to Sivas in August 1915, she wrote to her family and friends in America who were awaiting to hear updates on the situation. In Sivas, Graffam was overwhelmed with the care-taking of Armenian orphans. She was also entrusted to hide and bury financial records and jewelry that Armenians had given her for safekeeping and to transfer valuable goods to safer locations. Graffam also hid Armenian girls who were to be abducted into Muslim households. In order not to attract the attention of officials, Graffam secretly hid hundreds of girls by placing them with families in neighboring towns. In 1916, she appealed to ABCFM Treasurer William W. Peet: 

After the Ottoman government cut off diplomatic ties with the American government due to America's involvement in World War I, Mary Graffam managed to remain in Sivas. Graffam wrote in a letter to U.S. Commissioner Lewis Heck, dated January 27, 1919, about the forceful conversions of Armenian orphaned girls into Islam:

Mary Graffam wrote an account of her experiences in 1919, titling it her "Own Story."

Graffam was also a strong advocate of an independent Armenia where she and others argued would free the Armenians from "Turkish domination."

After her death, she was mourned by the thousands of people whose lives she had saved.

See also
Witnesses and testimonies of the Armenian genocide

References

People from Monson, Maine
Oberlin College alumni
Writers from Maine
Female Christian missionaries
American Protestant missionaries
1871 births
1921 deaths
Witnesses of the Armenian genocide
Protestant missionaries in the Ottoman Empire
Protestant missionaries in Turkey